The Warthen Historic District is a  historic district in Warthen, Georgia which was listed on the National Register of Historic Places in 1997.  The listing included 39 contributing buildings and 2 contributing sites.
It includes the junction of Georgia State Route 15, Georgia State Route 102, Warthen St., Old Sadersville-Sparta and Walker Dairy Roads.

It includes Greek Revival, Queen Anne, and Colonial Revival architecture.

It includes the Warthen Jail, built c.1873, "significant as one of the oldest known jails and as one of the oldest intact buildings in Georgia. It is
also significant for its log construction with hand-hewn logs."

References

National Register of Historic Places in Washington County, Georgia
Historic districts on the National Register of Historic Places in Georgia (U.S. state)
Greek Revival architecture in Georgia (U.S. state)
Queen Anne architecture in Georgia (U.S. state)
Colonial Revival architecture in Georgia (U.S. state)
Buildings and structures completed in 1783